The Crosman Pumpmaster 760, or Crosman 760 Pumpmaster, is an American-made multi-pump pneumatic air gun that is manufactured for target shooting, plinking, and small pest control. The Crosman 760 Pumpmaster is a BB gun with more than 16 million copies sold. It has a caliber of .177 and can shoot up to 645 fps for BBs and 615 for Pellets. Pellets are loaded into a 5-shot clip, while BBs have an 18-shot magazine, which is fed from the 200-shot reservoir. It comes standard with a fiber optic front sight, but can accommodate a scope on the 3/8 inch (9.5 mm) dovetail rail on top of the receiver. The rear sight is a notch sight and is adjustable for elevation using a 5-rail elevator piece.

Hunting
This gun may be used for hunting small pests, up to small game. The 760 Pumpmaster is very accurate and is capable of hitting a target at ranges of up to 20 yards.

External links
 Pumpmaster 760 at Crosman Official Website

Pneumatic weapons
Air guns of the United States
Crosman guns